Uğur Kapisiz (born 9 May 1987, in Uzunköprü, Turkey) is a Turkish footballer who currently plays as a midfielder for Edirnespor.

External links
 Gençlerbirliği Site Profile
 
 

1987 births
Living people
Gençlerbirliği S.K. footballers
Turkish footballers
Association football midfielders